A list of rivers of Brandenburg, Germany:

A
Alte Oder
Alte Schlaube

B
Bäke
Berste
Black Elster
Briese
Buckau

D
Dahme
Demnitz
Döllnfließ
Dömnitz
Dorche
Dosse

E
Elbe
Elde

F
Finow
Fredersdorfer Mühlenfließ

G
Glinze
Glunze
Große Röder

H
Hammerfließ
Hammergraben
Havel
Hühnerwasser

J
Jäglitz
Jeetzbach

K
Karthane
Kindelfließ
Kleine Elster
Kleine Röder
Küstriner Bach

L
Lausitzer Neiße
Löcknitz

M
Malxe
Meynbach
Muhre

N
Neuenhagener Mühlenfließ
Nieplitz
Nonnenfließ
Notte
Nuthe

O
Oder
Oelse

P
Panke
Pfefferfließ
Plane
Planfließ
Pößnitz
Pulsnitz

R
Radduscher Kahnfahrt
Ragöse
Randow
Rhin
Ruhlander Schwarzwasser

S
Schlatbach
Schlaube
Schwärze
Schwarze Elster
Schweinitzer Fließ
Sophienfließ
Spree
Staabe
Stobber
Stepenitz
Strom

T
Tarnitz
Tegeler Fließ

U
Uecker
Uska Luke

V
Vetschauer Mühlenfließ

W
Welse
Woblitz
Wublitz

 
Brandenburg-related lists
Brandenburg